Tarik Džindo (born 26 September 1998) is a Bosnian professional footballer who plays as a centre back for Bosnian Premier League club FK Željezničar.

References

1998 births
Living people
Footballers from Sarajevo
Bosnia and Herzegovina footballers
Association football central defenders
FK Željezničar Sarajevo players